Sekolah Menengah Sains Kota Tinggi (abbreviated SAKTI) is a boarding school located in Bandar Penawar, Kota Tinggi District, Johor, Malaysia. SAKTI is a 34th family of Sekolah Berasrama Penuh(SBP). Located on an area of 50 acres and 50 km away from the town of Kota Tinggi towards Desaru tour centre.

History
Work for measuring the school site was started in February 1994. Entire projects were completed in July 1996. Form one of the first group of 179 persons were to report to pda 12 August 1996. The first Principal was Mr. Hj. Ahmad b. Wagiman assisted by Mr. Nasuha b. Paiman as a Senior Assistant Academic and Tn. Hj. Osman b. Ahmad as a Senior Assistant Student Affairs.

Vision
 Vision Excellence and Excellence Human-based First Class. Didududa

References

External links
 

1996 establishments in Malaysia
Co-educational boarding schools
Educational institutions established in 1996
Kota Tinggi District